The Middlebury Panthers men's ice hockey team represents Middlebury College in men’s hockey and has done so since 1922 (with the exception of a few years during World War II). The Panthers currently play at the Division III and have won the most championships (8) of any D-III program. For a time the team did play along with top-level programs but when men's ice hockey divided into separate tiers in the mid-1960s Middlebury left the upper echelon.

History
Middlebury played as an Independent program, as all schools did officially, prior to 1950 but the Panthers were a founding member of the NCAA's first ice hockey conference, the Tri-State League. The Panthers remained in the conference for nine years but through most of that time they were pushed around by the national powers Clarkson, Rensselaer and St. Lawrence. Towards the end of their tenure in the conference, however, Middlebury did land a recruit who would rewrite the NCAA record book.

Phil Latreille joined the Panthers in 1957 and began playing immediately. Normally, freshmen did not play for varsity squads as the NCAA only allowed players eligibility for three seasons. However, because Middlebury wasn't in contention for the national tournament, they could ignore that NCAA regulation. Latreille scored 36 goals in only 20 games in his first year then set a new single-season record with 57 goals as a sophomore. For his third season, Latreille shattered his record with 77 goals and capped that off with a senior season of 80 goals and 108 points. No other player in NCAA history has even scored 60 goals in a season. Latreille held the points record for 24 years before being surpassed by Bill Watson, who played in more than twice as many games in his record-breaking campaign. Latreille still holds the NCAA record for career goals at 250 with second a distant 94 goals behind (Chuck Delich). Latreille's scoring exploits were so spectacular that he was able to parley them into a brief appearance with the New York Rangers after graduating. While he didn't stick in the National Hockey League, Latreille remains Middlebury's only alumnus to play in the NHL.

After Latreille left, Middlebury became one of the 28 founding members of ECAC Hockey, remaining with the conference for three seasons. By the end of the 1963–64 season it was obvious that ECAC Hockey had to make a change and the conference divided itself into upper- and lower-tiers. This was the first formal delineation of men's ice hockey and Middlebury was one of the 14 teams that founded ECAC 2. The Panthers played well under Wendall Forbes and typically finished in the top half of the conference. In 1971 Middlebury was again a founding member of a conference, this time for the NESCAC, though because the new conference didn't sponsor ice hockey as a varsity sport the Panthers remained with ECAC 2.

By the mid-1970s ECAC 2 had become just as ungainly as ECAC Hockey had been, boasting 31 programs by 1977. Rather than split into separate conferences, ECAC 2 divided itself into East and West Divisions with both playing separate postseason tournaments. Middlebury won its first conference tournament in 1979 but because NESCAC rules prohibited them from participating in any national tournament the Panthers didn't receive an invitation to the 1979 Championship.

When the NCAA instituted numerical classifications in 1973, Middlebury became a Division III school but the ice hockey program played at the Division II level. This continued for a decade until the NCAA instituted a Division III Championship and, while the Panthers could not participate in the tournament, most of their contemporaries were able to play in the championship. As a result, almost the entire D-II level dropped down to the lower tier with Middlebury going along. During the change came a formal split for ECAC 2 with Middlebury founding yet another ice hockey conference, this one called ECAC East.

In the mid-'80s Forbes stepped down and was replaced by Bill Beaney. It took Beaney a short time to rebuild the program and five years after he took over the Panthers won both the conference regular season and tournament titles. In 1994 the NESCAC changed its rules to permit its member teams to play in one postseason tournament, either conference or national, and a year later Middlebury made its first appearance in the Division III championship. Middlebury jumped in with both feet and won each of their games, including the championship over #1-ranked Fredonia State to capture the school's first national title in any sport. Beaney kept the panthers at the top of Division III and won five consecutive national championships (1995–1999), setting an NCAA record for any level of play.

Middlebury's championship streak ended in 2000, the same year that the NESCAC began to sponsor ice hockey as a sport and Middlebury joined 8 other schools to form the new conference. The NESCAC also allowed their member schools to play in both the conference and national tournaments beginning in 2000. This allowed the Panthers to play in their first conference tournament in 5 years and win their first of three consecutive titles. Beaney took a sabbatical in 2003 but returned the year after to lead Middlebury to three consecutive titles for a total of 8. The team was in contention for a ninth championship in 2007 but fell to Oswego State in overtime. The program slowly declined after its first championship loss and, after Beaney retired in 2015, the team has yet to post a winning season.

Season-by-season results
Source:

This is a partial list of Middlebury's record. It covers the time from when Middlebury restarted the ice hockey program after World War II until the program officially left the top tier of men's ice hockey.

Note: GP = Games played, W = Wins, L = Losses, T = Ties

* Winning percentage is used when conference schedules are unbalanced.† Middlebury tied Clarkson for the best record in the conference. The two then played a single game to determine the sole champion for the Tri-State League.

Footnotes

All-time coaching records 
As of completion of 2018–19 season

Olympians
This is a list of Middlebury alumni were a part of an Olympic team.

References

 
College men's ice hockey teams in the United States
Ice hockey teams in Vermont
Ice Hockey, Men
1922 establishments in Vermont
Ice hockey clubs established in 1922